Allium stellatum, commonly known as the autumn onion, prairie onion, cliff onion, or glade onion, is a North American species of wild onion in the Amaryllidaceae family that is native to central Canada and the central United States.

Description
Allium stellatum is a perennial forming a bulb underground. The leaves die back as the rounded umbel of pink to purple flowers forms at the end of the scape in the summer. The bulbs are strongly flavored but edible.

Etymology
The genus name Allium is from the classical Latin name for garlic. The species name stellatum is botanical Latin for "starry", and refers to the umbels. This species was described for science by John Bellenden Ker Gawler in 1813.

Distribution and habitat
The plant ranges from Ontario and Saskatchewan south to Tennessee and Texas. Allium stellatum grows in rocky, sandy soil.

Ecology
A. stellatum attracts small bees and flies to its foliage. It probably is not eaten by native mammals because of its strong scent and taste.

References

External links
 

stellatum
Onions
Edible plants
Plants described in 1813
Flora of Western Canada
Flora of Eastern Canada
Flora of the Northeastern United States
Flora of the Southeastern United States
Flora of the North-Central United States
Flora of the South-Central United States